Document Structure Description, or DSD, is a schema language for XML, that is, a language for describing valid XML documents. It's an alternative to DTD or the W3C XML Schema.

An example of DSD in its simplest form:

This says that element named "foo" in the XML namespace "http://example.com" may have two attributes, named "first" and "second". A "foo" element may not have any character data. It must contain one subelement, named "bar", also in the "http://example.com" namespace. A "bar" element is not allowed any attributes, character data or subelements.

One XML document that would be valid according to the above DSD would be:

Current Software store 
 Prototype Java Processor from BRICS

External links 
DSD home page
Full DSD specification
Comparison of DTD, W3C XML Schema, and DSD

XML-based standards
XML
Data modeling languages